Why Him? is a 2016 American buddy comedy film written and directed by John Hamburg, co-written by Ian Helfer, and starring James Franco and Bryan Cranston with Zoey Deutch, Megan Mullally, Griffin Gluck and Keegan-Michael Key in supporting roles. The film follows a father who tries to stop his daughter's immature tech-millionaire boyfriend from asking her to marry him.

The film premiered in Los Angeles on December 17, 2016, was released by 20th Century Fox in the United States on December 23, 2016. It received generally negative reviews from critics, but was a financial success, grossing $118 million worldwide on a $52 million dollar budget.

Plot 
Stanford student Stephanie Fleming invites her boyfriend Laird Mayhew over to "Netflix and chill". Meanwhile, back home in Grand Rapids, Stephanie's dad Ned is celebrating his 55th birthday with friends and family at an Applebee's restaurant. During a slideshow presentation in his honor, Stephanie drops in via webcam to congratulate him, when suddenly her boyfriend walks in on her and flashes the camera.

Stephanie drives her family – parents Ned and Barb and younger brother Scotty  – to Laird's villa to meet him. She explains to Ned that Laird is the CEO of a video game company, which has made him extremely wealthy. Laird gives the family a tour of his house, complete with curse words and inappropriate comments about Barb. He then reveals a large tattoo of the Flemings' Christmas card on his back, complete with "Happy Holidays" written underneath. In the living room is a tank with a moose filled completely with its urine. The basement has a bowling alley that Laird built with a mural of Ned, posed in a "crotch-chop" position.

Ned talks to Stephanie about Laird's behavior and she asks him to give him a chance. Later, Laird invites Ned to go for a walk in the woods outside his house and asks Ned for his blessing to propose to Stephanie to marry him. Ned is quick to say no, which completely blindsides Laird, who had been confident that Ned would say yes. Laird promises to win him over.

As the family gathers in Laird's living room for a Christmas party, Laird reveals that he bought Ned's struggling printing company as a gift to remove all his debts. Instead of expressing gratitude, Ned punches Laird in the face and they begin to fight. Stephanie and Barb are both angry at the partner's behavior, and the family leaves Laird's home.

On Christmas Day, the Flemings are celebrating without Stephanie. They are surprised when Laird's helicopter arrives with Stephanie. She is still mad at both Ned and Laird for their behavior and refuses to talk to either of them. Ned and Laird talk and Laird gets Ned's blessing to propose to Stephanie. However, Stephanie declines the proposal saying she is not ready to get married, but she wants them to continue dating.

Later during the party, Ned and Scotty approach Laird for a new business idea, since they are all part of the same company now. Scotty says they should sell the same toilets Laird has in his home since they would be very profitable. Laird likes the idea and agrees. The couples then dance together as music plays, with Ned referring to Laird as "son".

Scotty, Ned, and Laird eventually turn the printing company into a toilet factory and become a profitable company. Stephanie uses the Fleming-Mayhew conglomerate to help underdeveloped countries with their sewage projects. Finally, Laird has what he always wanted, to be part of a family.

Cast 
 James Franco as Laird Mayhew, an eccentric, foul-mouthed CEO of a video game company and Stephanie's boyfriend
 Bryan Cranston as Ned Fleming, Stephanie's conservative father and Barb's husband
 Zoey Deutch as Stephanie Fleming, Laird's girlfriend, Ned and Barb's daughter, and Scotty's older sister
 Megan Mullally as Barb Fleming, Ned's wife and Stephanie's mother
 Cedric the Entertainer as Lou Dunne, Patty's husband and Ned's best friend and business partner
 Griffin Gluck as Scotty Fleming, Stephanie's 15-year-old younger brother and Ned and Barb's son
 Keegan-Michael Key as Gustav, Laird's best friend, butler, assistant and trainer, who also manages his estate
 Tangie Ambrose as Patty Dunne, Lou's wife 
 Zack Pearlman as Kevin Dingle, Ned's I.T. guy
 Kaley Cuoco as the voice of Justine, Laird's in-home artificial intelligence
 Casey Wilson as Missy Pederman, Blaine's sister and the owner of an online invitation company called StampFree Invites
 Andrew Rannells as Blaine Pederman, Missy's brother and business partner
 Adam DeVine as Tyson Modell, the creator of the wildly popular Ghostchat app
 Steve Bannos as Tree Lot Owner Burt
 Mary Pat Gleason as Joyce
 Bob Stephenson as Jerry in Graphics
There are cameos by technology, gaming, and entertainment figures, including Burnie Burns, Steve Aoki, Richard Blais, Elon Musk, Toby Turner, and Gene Simmons and Paul Stanley of KISS.

Production 
On November 18, 2014, it was announced that John Hamburg and Ian Helfer were co-writing a comedy film, Why Him?, for 20th Century Fox. On February 27, 2015, James Franco was in talks to star in the film, playing a young billionaire. Shawn Levy's 21 Laps Entertainment and Ben Stiller's Red Hour Productions were set to produce the film, about a Midwestern father who travels with his family to visit his daughter at college, and finds himself disliking her new billionaire boyfriend. On August 25, 2015, Bryan Cranston was set to star in the film, playing the father. In August 2015, the film was selected by the California Film Commission to receive $5.4 million in tax credits.

On December 8, 2015, Zoey Deutch was cast in the film's female lead role, as Cranston's character's daughter and the billionaire's girlfriend. Bryce Dallas Howard, Jordana Brewster and Mélanie Laurent were also considered. On January 12, 2016, Griffin Gluck was added to the cast of the film to play Scotty Fleming, the son of Cranston's character. On January 13, 2016, Megan Mullally joined the film to play Barb Fleming, the wife of Ned (Cranston). On January 19, 2016, Keegan-Michael Key was cast as the billionaire's European-hailing estate manager, and following him, Zack Pearlman also signed on for a role in the film. Musician Steve Aoki also appeared in the film.

Principal photography on the film began in mid-February 2016 in Los Angeles.

Release 
Why Him? was released in the United States on December 23, 2016, by 20th Century Fox. It was originally planned for a November 11, 2016 release date.

The film was released on DVD, Blu-ray and digital copy on March 28, 2017.

Box office 
Why Him? grossed $60.3 million in the United States and Canada and $57.8 million in other territories for a worldwide total of $118.1 million, against a production budget of $52 million.

Why Him? was expected to gross $10–14 million from 2,917 theaters over its first four days of release. It grossed $3.9 million on its first day and $11 million during its opening weekend (a four-day total of $15.5 million), finishing 4th at the box office.

Critical response 
The website's critical consensus reads: "Solidly cast but overall misconceived, Why Him? offers the odd chuckle, but ultimately adds disappointingly little to its tired father-vs.-fiancé formula." On Metacritic, the film has a weighted average score of 39 out of 100, based on 30 critics, indicating "generally unfavorable reviews". Audiences polled by CinemaScore gave the film an average grade of "B+" on an A+ to F scale.

Commentary

French political scientist Thibault Muzergues remarks in his book The Great Class Shift that the film captures the tension created by the contrast in values between the Protestant work ethic of the suburban middle class, as represented by Ned, and the looser approach of Laird and other members of the creative class, a real sociopolitical phenomenon.

See also
 List of Christmas films

References

External links 
 
 
 

2016 films
2016 romantic comedy films
2010s Christmas films
2010s Christmas comedy films
20th Century Fox films
21 Laps Entertainment films
American Christmas comedy films
American romantic comedy films
2010s English-language films
Films about marriage
Films about father–daughter relationships
Films directed by John Hamburg
Films produced by Ben Stiller
Films produced by Jonah Hill
Films scored by Theodore Shapiro
Films set in Palo Alto, California
Films set in Michigan
Films shot in Los Angeles
Films with screenplays by John Hamburg
Midlife crisis films
Red Hour Productions films
Films with screenplays by Jonah Hill
2010s American films